Greya sparsipunctella is a moth of the  family Prodoxidae. It is found along the northern California coast of the United States. The habitat consists of low, forb-rich ocean cliff vegetation and moist coniferous forest.

The wingspan is 23–27 mm, making it the largest Greya species. The forewings have a very light base color, irrorated (speckled) with dark brown scales. The hindwings are uniformly grayish brown.

References

Moths described in 1907
Prodoxidae